United States lightship Buffalo (LV-82) was a lightship built in 1911 for the United States Lighthouse Service and stationed off Point Abino, Ontario, Canada to help guide vessels heading for the harbor at Buffalo, New York.
During the Great Lakes Storm of 1913, LV-82 stayed at its assigned station and was sunk with the loss of all six crew members.

On May 13, 1914 the wreckage of LV-82 was located two miles from its assigned location in 63 feet of water. Following two failed salvage attempts, LV-82 was raised from the bottom using pontoons and sent to be refurbished. She served as a relief ship from 1916 to 1925, and was stationed as the Eleven Foot Shoals Lightship from 1925 up to her decommissioning.

The Buffalo was in service until 1936 when she was decommissioned. After decommissioning, papers were signed by President Franklin D. Roosevelt to have her moved to a VFW post in Massachusetts.  However, this never happened as she was burnt at the dock by vandals, and was considered a total loss, so she was scrapped.

References

Lightships of the United States
Maritime incidents in 1913
1911 ships
Ships lost with all hands